Events in the year 2023 in Cape Verde.

Incumbents 

 President: José Maria Neves
 Prime Minister: Ulisses Correia e Silva

Events 
Ongoing – COVID-19 pandemic in Cape Verde

Sports 

 15  January: Leg 1 and 2 of the 2023 The Ocean Race,

References 

 
2020s in Cape Verde
Years of the 21st century in Cape Verde
Cape Verde
Cape Verde